Tasneem Ahmed Qureshi is a Pakistani politician who had been a member of the National Assembly of Pakistan from 2002 to 2013.

Political career
He served as former tehsil nazim.

He was elected to the National Assembly of Pakistan from Constituency NA-66 (Sargodha-III) as a candidate of Pakistan Peoples Party (PPP) in 2002 Pakistani general election. He received 40,448 votes and defeated Muhammad Arshad Shahid, a candidate of Muttahida Majlis-e-Amal (MMA).

He was re-elected to the National Assembly from Constituency NA-66 (Sargodha-III) as a candidate of PPP in 2008 Pakistani general election. He received 69,943 voted and defeated Chaudhry Hamid Hameed. He also served as minister of state for interior.

He ran for the seat of the National Assembly from Constituency NA-66 (Sargodha-III)  as a candidate of PPP in 2013 Pakistani general election but was unsuccessful. He received 29,624 votes and lost the seat to Chaudhry Hamid Hameed.

References

Living people
Pakistani MNAs 2002–2007
Pakistani MNAs 2008–2013
Punjabi people
Year of birth missing (living people)